The Diechterhorn is a mountain in the Urner Alps, overlooking the Haslital in the Bernese Oberland. At 3,389 metres above sea level it is the highest summit of the Urner Alps lying within the canton of Bern.

On its east side lies the upper basin of the Trift Glacier, the summit of the Dammastock being located about five kilometres east. On its west side lies the Gelmersee at 1,849 metres.

The Gelmer hut, lying at 2,412 metres above the Gelmersee, is the closest hut. It is a common base for climbers.

References

External links
Diechterhorn on Summitpost

Mountains of the Alps
Alpine three-thousanders
Mountains of Switzerland
Mountains of the canton of Bern